Charles Bardot (born 7 April 1904, date of death unknown) was a French footballer. He played in six matches for the France national football team between 1925 and 1932.

References

External links
 
 
 

1904 births
Year of death missing
French footballers
France international footballers
Place of birth missing
Association football forwards
AS Cannes players
Olympic footballers of France
Footballers at the 1928 Summer Olympics